Eric Otto Gunnarsson Virgin (31 March 1920 – 9 September 2004) was a Swedish diplomat.

Career
Virgin was born in Stockholm, Sweden, the son of colonel Gunnar Virgin and Elsie, née Ramel (aunt to Povel Ramel). He passed his reserve officer exam in 1941 and received a Candidate of Law degree in 1942. Virgin became an attaché the same year at the Ministry for Foreign Affairs.

Career
Virgin served in New York City in 1943, Washington, D.C. in 1945 and at the Ministry of Finance from 1947 to 1949. Early in his career he was associate of Dag Hammarskjöld in cases involving international financial issues.

He became first administrative officer in 1949, first secretary at the Foreign Ministry in 1950 and was director there in 1955. Virgin was embassy counselor in Rome from 1957 to 1962 and was Permanent Representative of Sweden to the United Nations in New York City from 1962 to 1963. He was head of the Foreign Ministry's Report Secretariat from 1963 to 1965 and was director-general of the Foreign Ministry's negotiating team in Stockholm from 1965 to 1966. Virgin was then envoy in Pretoria, Gaborone and Maseru from 1966 to 1970, Bangkok, Kuala Lumpur, Singapore, Rangoon and Vientiane from 1970 to 1976 and in East Berlin from 1976 to 1982. He was fiscal policy negotiator at the Foreign Ministry from 1982 to 1983 and ambassador in Rome and Valletta from 1983 to 1986.

Virgin participated in various negotiations, including in the Organisation for Economic Co-operation and Development between 1947 and 1957. He was a consultant for FFV International in 1986, chairman of the Association of Friends of Swedish Museums (Svenska museivänföreningen), Association of Friends of the Museum of Far Eastern Antiquities (Föreningen Östasiatiska Museets Vänner) and the Swedish Committee Pro Venezia (Svenska kommittén Pro Venezia).

Personal life
Virgin married on 19 May 1951 with Gitt Cassel (born 1927), daughter of works manager Fredrik Cassel and Margareta, née Lindforss. He was the father of Louise (born 1953) and Caroline (born 1954). Virgin died in 2004 and was buried at Norra begravningsplatsen in Stockholm.

Awards
Knight of the Order of the Polar Star
Commander of the Order of Merit of the Federal Republic of Germany
Knight, First Class of the Order of St. Olav
King Haakon VII Freedom Cross

References

1920 births
2004 deaths
Ambassadors of Sweden to South Africa
Ambassadors of Sweden to Botswana
Ambassadors of Sweden to Lesotho
Ambassadors of Sweden to Thailand
Ambassadors of Sweden to Malaysia
Ambassadors of Sweden to Singapore
Ambassadors of Sweden to Myanmar
Ambassadors of Sweden to Laos
Ambassadors of Sweden to East Germany
Ambassadors of Sweden to Italy
Ambassadors of Sweden to Malta
People from Stockholm
Knights of the Order of the Polar Star
Recipients of the King Haakon VII Freedom Cross
Burials at Norra begravningsplatsen
Swedish expatriates in the United States